Ividella is a genus of sea snails, marine gastropod mollusks in the family Pyramidellidae, the pyrams and their allies.

Species
Species within the genus Ividella include:

References

External links
 To ITIS

Pyramidellidae
Gastropod genera